The 22 Division is a division of the Sri Lanka Army. Established on 23 July 1997, the division is currently based in Trincomalee in the Eastern Province. The division is a part of Security Forces Headquarters – East and has four brigades.

References

1997 establishments in Sri Lanka
Military units and formations established in 1997
Organisations based in Eastern Province, Sri Lanka
Sri Lanka Army divisions